Sahodarara Savaal is a 1977 Indian Kannada-language film directed by K. S. R. Das. It stars Vishnuvardhan and Rajinikanth. It was one of the few films that Rajinikanth acted in Kannada. The film was remade in Telugu as Annadammula Savaal (1978). It was released on 16 September 1977.

Plot

Cast 
 Vishnuvardhan as Kiran
 Rajinikanth as Shekhar
 Balakrishna as Krishnappa
 Jayamalini as Parvati
 Leelavathi
 Kavitha as Jyothi
 Bhavani as Lakshmi
 Dwarakish as Raja

Soundtrack 
The music of Sahodarara Savaal was composed by Satyam. The song "Hey Nanagaagiye" became popular. It went on to be retained in the Telugu version as "Naakosame Neevunnadhi".

References

Bibliography

External links 
 

1970s Kannada-language films
1977 films
Films directed by K. S. R. Das
Films scored by Satyam (composer)
Kannada films remade in other languages